Events from the year 1708 in Denmark.

Incumbents
 Monarch – Frederick IV
 Grand Chancellor – Conrad von Reventlow (until 21 July), Christian Christophersen Sehested

Events
 1 January  The County of Golsteinsborg is established by Ulrik Adolf Holstein from the manors of Holsteinborg, Snedinge and Fuirendal.

Undated
 1708-09  Frederick IV visits Italy.
 Johann Gottfried Becker passes the Royal Court Pharmacy in Copenhagen on to his son Gottfried Becker.
 Hans Peter Pelt obtains a license to establish Copenhagen's second sugar refinery.

Births
 22 March – Ernst Henrich Berling, publisher, founder of Berlingske (died 1750)
 22 October – Frederic Louis Norden, naval captain and explorer (died 1742)

Fyll date missing
 Peter Christian Winsløw, medal engraver (died c. 1756)
 Peter Christian Winsløw, medal engraver (died 1756)

Deaths
 21 July – Conrad von Reventlow, statesman, Grand Chancellor of Denmark (born 1644)

References

 
1700s in Denmark
Denmark
Years of the 18th century in Denmark